Gentry normally refers to a certain class of people.

Gentry may also refer to:

Gentry in particular nations
Landed gentry, in the United Kingdom
Gentry (China)
Polish landed gentry

Places in the United States
Gentry, Arkansas
Gentry, Missouri
Gentry County, Missouri
Gentry, Texas

Other uses
Gentry (surname)
Montgomery Gentry, an American country music duo
Gentry Complex, a multipurpose arena in Nashville, Tennessee
Bruce Gentry, a 1949 American movie serial
Bruce Gentry (comic strip)
Merry Gentry, a series of books by Laurell K. Hamilton
USS Gentry (DE-349), a United States naval vessel
The Gentry, a thoroughbred racehorse from New Zealand
The Gentry (band), an American electronic and alternative rock band
The Gentrys, a 1960s American pop band